Sandow's Magazine of Physical Culture, established by Eugen Sandow in 1898, has been regarded as the first bodybuilding magazine.

Founded in July 1898 under the name Physical Culture, the magazine was renamed Sandow's Magazine of Physical Culture in April 1899. Howard Spicer was editor. Contributors included the music-hall artist Dan Leno, and several young writers who would subsequently achieve fame: P. G. Wodehouse, H. H. Munro and George Douglas Brown.  It closed, due to a decline in interest, in June 1907.

References

External links
 Holdings list of the Wellcome Collection.
 Brief selection of articles published online.

Bodybuilding magazines
Monthly magazines published in the United Kingdom
Defunct magazines published in the United Kingdom
Magazines established in 1898
Magazines disestablished in 1907
Sports magazines published in the United Kingdom
Physical culture